Dirty Money is a Canadian drama film from Quebec, directed by Denys Arcand and released in 1972. It was the first feature-length narrative film directed by Arcand.

The film stars René Caron and Luce Guilbeault as Rolland and Berthe Soucy, a couple who are financially struggling. Rolland's wealthy uncle Arthur (Léo Gagnon) comes for a visit and offers them a gift of money to help out, but withdraws the offer after they quibble with the amount; after he leaves, Rolland and Berthe decide to go to his house and rob him. Unbeknownst to them, however, their reclusive tenant Ernest (Marcel Sabourin) follows them with a criminal plan of his own.

It was later screened at the 1984 Festival of Festivals as part of Front & Centre, a special retrospective program of artistically and culturally significant films from throughout the history of Canadian cinema.

References

External links
 

1972 films
1972 crime drama films
Canadian crime drama films
1970s French-language films
Films directed by Denys Arcand
French-language Canadian films
1970s Canadian films